Ramularia brunnea is a fungal plant pathogen infecting strawberries. It was first described scientifically by American mycologist Charles Horton Peck.

References

Fungal strawberry diseases
Fungi described in 1878
Fungi of North America
brunnea
Taxa named by Charles Horton Peck